Benjamin Rice Faunce Jr. (1873–1949) was an American druggist and businessman who created the soft drink Boost! and established the Boost! Company.

Early life
Faunce was born in 1873 in Philadelphia, Pennsylvania to Benjamin Rice Faunce and Clarinda Lockard.

Career
Faunce later moved to Riverside, New Jersey where he became a licensed druggist in 1905. He sold remedies he had created such as headache capsules, cough syrup and toothpaste. Faunce reportedly set out to create a soft drink without bubbles and around 1910, invented a drink which he called "Tak-Aboost". He dispensed the drink in concentrated form from a soda fountain. In 1913, after years of experimenting with the drink, Faunce registered the brand as a trademark.

He formed the Boost! Company on May 15, 1915, for the purpose of manufacturing and selling the product. He opened "Boost" shops in places near Riverside such as Burlington and Palmyra. Faunce was president of the Boost Company until his death on April 27, 1949.

Personal life
He was married to Mable C. Lewis and later Maude F. Faunce and had three sons called B. Paul Faunce, Randle B. Faunce and E. Lester Stockton, Sr. who were employees of the Boost! Company. Faunce's granddaughter Helen Faunce Anderson also worked for the company.

References

1873 births
1949 deaths
20th-century American businesspeople
20th-century American inventors
American drink industry businesspeople
Businesspeople from New Jersey
People from Riverside Township, New Jersey
Pharmacists from New Jersey